is an interchange passenger railway station located in the city of  Funabashi, Chiba Prefecture, Japan.

Lines
Kita-Narashino Station is a junction station for the Shin-Keisei Electric Railway's  Shin-Keisei Line and the Tōyō Rapid Railway’s  Tōyō Rapid Railway Line. It is 21.0 kilometers from the terminus of the Shin-Keisei Line at Matsudo Station and is 8.1 kilometers from the terminus of the Tōyō Rapid Railway Line at Nishi-Funabashi Station.

Station layout 
Shin-Keisei Kita-Narashino Station has a single island platform, with an elevated station building. The Tōyō Rapid Railway Line is an underground station with a single island platform.

Platforms

History
Kita-Narashino Station was opened on April 11, 1966 as a station on the Shin-Keisei Railway Line. The Tōyō Rapid Railway Line connected to the station on April 27, 1996. The Shin-Keisei Line completed a new station building in 2009.

Passenger statistics
In fiscal 2018, the Shin Keisei portion of the station was used by an average of 46,256 passengers daily. During the same period the Tōyō Rapid Railway portion of the station was used by 20,594 passengers daily.

Surrounding area
 Narashinodai housing complex
 Kitanarashino Neighborhood Park
 Funabashi City Higashi Library / Narashinodai Public Hall
 Funabashi City Takago Elementary Schooll

See also
 List of railway stations in Japan

References

External links

 Shin Keisei Railway Station information 
 Tōyō Rapid Railway Station information  

Railway stations in Japan opened in 1966
Railway stations in Chiba Prefecture

Funabashi